Don't Rush may refer to:
 "Don't Rush" (Kelly Clarkson song), a song by Kelly Clarkson featuring Vince Gill
 "Don't Rush" (Young T & Bugsey song), a song by Young T & Bugsey featuring Headie One
 "Don't Rush (Take Love Slowly)", a song by K-Ci & JoJo
 "Don't Rush", a song by Jay Sean from Me Against Myself
 "Don't Rush", a song by Silk from Silk 
 "Don't Rush", a song by Tegan and Sara from Sainthood
 "Don't Rush", a song by Scott Savol

See also
 "Don't Rush Me", a 1988 song by Taylor Dayne
 Don't Rush Challenge, a phenomenon circulating the Internet that incorporates the song "Don't Rush" by  Young T & Bugsey featuring Headie One